Sequential dynamical systems (SDSs) are a class of graph dynamical systems. They are discrete dynamical systems which generalize many aspects of for example classical cellular automata, and they provide a framework for studying asynchronous processes over graphs. The analysis of SDSs uses techniques from combinatorics, abstract algebra, graph theory, dynamical systems and probability theory.

Definition
An SDS is constructed from the following components:

 A finite graph Y with vertex set v[Y] = {1,2, ... , n}. Depending on the context the graph can be directed or undirected.
 A state xv for each vertex i of Y taken from a finite set K. The system state is the n-tuple x = (x1, x2, ... , xn), and x[i] is the tuple consisting of the states associated to the vertices in the 1-neighborhood of i in Y (in some fixed order).
 A vertex function fi for each vertex i. The vertex function maps the state of vertex i at time t to the vertex state at time t + 1 based on the states associated to the 1-neighborhood of i in Y.
 A word w = (w1, w2, ... , wm) over v[Y]. 

It is convenient to introduce the Y-local maps Fi constructed from the vertex functions by

 

The word w specifies the sequence in which the Y-local maps are composed to derive the sequential dynamical system map F: Kn → Kn as

 

If the update sequence is a permutation one frequently speaks of a permutation SDS to emphasize this point. 
The phase space associated to a sequential dynamical system with map F: Kn → Kn is the finite directed graph with vertex set Kn and directed edges (x, F(x)). The structure of the phase space is governed by the properties of the graph Y, the vertex functions (fi)i, and the update sequence w. A large part of SDS research seeks to infer phase space properties based on the structure of the system constituents.

Example
Consider the case where Y is the graph with vertex set {1,2,3} and undirected edges {1,2}, {1,3} and {2,3} (a triangle or 3-circle) with vertex states from K = {0,1}. For vertex functions use the symmetric, boolean function nor : K3 → K defined by nor(x,y,z) = (1+x)(1+y)(1+z) with boolean arithmetic. Thus, the only case in which the function nor returns the value 1 is when all the arguments are 0. Pick w = (1,2,3) as update sequence. Starting from the initial system state (0,0,0) at time t = 0 one computes the state of vertex 1 at time t=1 as nor(0,0,0) = 1. The state of vertex 2 at time t=1 is nor(1,0,0) = 0. Note that the state of vertex 1 at time t=1 is used immediately. Next one obtains the state of vertex 3 at time t=1 as nor(1,0,0) = 0. This completes the update sequence, and one concludes that the Nor-SDS map sends the system state (0,0,0) to (1,0,0). The system state (1,0,0) is in turned mapped to (0,1,0) by an application of the SDS map.

See also
Graph dynamical system
Boolean network
Gene regulatory network
Dynamic Bayesian network
Petri net

References
 
Predecessor and Permutation Existence Problems for Sequential Dynamical Systems
Genetic Sequential Dynamical Systems

Combinatorics
Graph theory
Networks
Abstract algebra
Dynamical systems